Peking University Law School is the law school of Peking University, a public research university in Beijing, China.

Founded in 1904 as the law department of Peking University, it is the oldest law school in China and is generally considered to be one of the most prestigious law schools in Asia. Since 2015, the law school has been ranked first in Mainland China and one of top three law schools in Asia every year by QS World University Rankings. The school has been generally regarded as one of the most highly competitive and selective law school in China. The school's Bachelor of Laws students have the highest average scores in China's college entrance examination among all law schools in China, the average acceptance rate of Master of Laws and Juris Master is less than 10% in 2017. 

Peking University Law School confers four types of law degrees: Bachelor of Laws, Master of Laws, Juris Master, and Doctor of Laws. As of 2017, PKU LAW employs more than 70 professors and has established 36 research centers. Four of the law school's disciplines including Legal Theory Studies, Constitution and Administrative Law Studies, Economic Law Studies, and Criminal Law Studies are ranked the best in China. The school publishes 11 legal journals including Peking University Law Journal (edited by staff members) and Peking University Law Review (edited by students).

Peking University Law School has produced a significant number of luminaries in both law and politics. Its alumni include China's incumbent Prime Minister Li Keqiang and four of the current justices of China's Supreme Court, Jiang Bixin, Nan Ying, Sun Huapu and Pei Xianding. According to a survey conducted in 2017, 246 partners of China's top 8 law firms are PKU LAW alumni, more than the second and the third-ranked law school combined. The school is also the workplace for some of the most prominent legal scholars in China, including Zhang Qianfan, Chen Xinliang, and He Weifang.

History 

Founded in 1904, Peking University Law School is China's oldest law school. Its parent institution, Peking University, is the first national university in modern China. In 1898, China's young emperor Guang Xu and his supporters initiated the "hundred days' reform", the reform was an attempt to modernize  China by reforming its government, economy and society. The short-lived reform saw the establishment of the Imperial University of Peking, which started offering law courses in 1902. It was one of only two law schools to not be closed during the upheaval of the Cultural Revolution in 1966–1976. In 1898, China's young emperor Guang Xu and his supporters initiated the "hundred days' reform", the reform was an attempt to modernize  China by reforming its government, economy and society  The short-lived reform saw the establishment of the Imperial University of Peking, which started offering law courses in 1902. It was one of only two law schools to not be closed during the upheaval of the Cultural Revolution in 1966–1976.

On May 24, 2003, in the prominent case of Sun Zhigang, three graduate students of the law school, Xu Zhiyong, Teng Biao and Yu Jiang submitted a proposal regarding the Measures of Custody and Repatriation for Urban Vagrants and Beggars to the Standing Committee of the National People's Congress, citing concerns that the provisions restricted personal freedom of citizens and contradicted with the civil rights protection clauses of the Constitution. The proposal urged the committee to conduct a review of the provisions' constitutionality and had drawn national attention. The State Council of China formally revoked the Measures of Custody and Repatriation for Urban Vagrants and Beggars on June 20, 2020. This case has been widely regarded as a landmark case of China's civil rights protection movement.

In 2005, three professors and three graduate students of the law school filed the first public interest litigation in China, asking the Heilongjiang Higher People's Court to fine the defendant PetroChina a total of 10 Billion Yuan to set up a public fund to restore the environment of the Songhua River, which was seriously polluted by an explosion of a Diphenyl Plant owned by PetroChina. However, the court refused to accept the case citing political concerns.

Periodicals 
Peking University Law Journal
Peking University Law Review

Prominent faculty 

 Zhang Qianfan: constitutional law, comparative constitution, Chinese constitution, constitutional theory

Chen Xingliang : criminal law philosophy, dogmatics of criminal law, case study of criminal law
He Weifang: history of western legal ideology, legal theory, comparative law, judiciary, foreign legal history
Chen Ruihua : criminal procedure, evidence law, judiciary, procedure theory, legal methodology
Bai Guimei: international law, basic theory of international law, international human rights law
 Bai Jianjun: criminology, criminal law, empirical legal study, financial criminology
 Che Hao : Chinese criminal law, foreign criminal law, philosophy and policy of criminal law
 Liang Genlin: criminal law, criminal policy science, criminology
 Gan Peizhong: enterprise law, corporation law, security law, economic law
 Ge Yunsong: general part of civil procedure, property law, law of obligations, law of negotiable instruments, NPO law
 Guo Li: economic law, international economic law, law and finance, commercial law, comparative law
 Guo Zili: foreign criminal law, law and biomedical technology
Jiang Shigong: jurisprudence, constitutional law, Hong Kong legal studies, legal sociology
 Liu Jianwen Professor: fiscal and taxation law, intellectual property law, economic law, international taxation law
 Liu Kaixiang: property law, contract law, partnership law, trust law
Pan Jianfeng: civil procedure, evidence law, arbitration system, judiciary
 Qian Mingxing: civil and commercial law Shen Kui: administrative law, constitutional law, national compensation system, human rights, risk management
Wang Jiancheng: criminal procedure law, evidence law
 Wang Jin: environmental law, economic law
 Wang Shizhou: criminal law, international criminal law, foreign criminal law, European criminal law
Wang Xixin: Chinese administrative law, analysis of legal and administrative process, administrative procedure, comparative administrative law
Wu Zhipan: international economic law,  nancial law
 Xu Aiguo: history of western legal ideology, Anglo American Law of Torts, foreign tax law
 Ye Jingyi: social law, labour law, social security law
 Zhang Ping: intellectual property law, Internet law
Zhang Shouwen: economic law,  scal and taxation law, social law
 Zhan Zhongle: administrative law, administrative procedure law, education law, environmental law, police law

Alumni 

Peking University Law School's prestige and large class size has enabled it to produce a large number of luminary alumni,  including the current prime minister of China Li Keqiang. Li Keqiang was enrolled in the law school in 1977 when the school resumed admission following the end of the cultural revolution. Four sitting justices of China's Supreme Court are alumni of Peking University Law school.

The school's alumni also include some of the most prominent legal scholars in China's modern history, including Mu Rui, founder of China's economic law and international economic law; Gong Xiangrui, prominent scholar of constitutional law; Wang Tieya, international jurist and former Justice of the International Criminal Tribunal of the former Yugoslavia. Zhang Guohua, legal historian, one of the founders of the studies of Chinese legal thought history; Xiao Weiyun, constitutional jurist, member of the Basic Law Drafting Committee of the Hong Kong Special Administrative Region and the Basic Law Drafting Committee of the Macao Special Administrative Region; Yang Chunxi, criminal jurist, one of founders of contemporary Chinese criminal law; Luo Haocai, administrative law jurist and former justice of China's supreme court.

Affiliated research institutions 
 PKU Institute of International Law
 PKU Research Centre for Law and Economics
 PKU Institute of Economic Law
 PKU Institute of Modern Law
 PKU Research Centre for Crime
 PKU Real Estate Law Center
 PKU Institute of Comparative Law & Sociology of Law
 PKU Fiscal Law Research Center
 PKU Science & Technology Law Center
 PKU Center for Public Participation Studies and Supports
 PKU Center for Hong Kong & Macao Studies
 PKU Civil Law Research Centre
 PKU Financial Law Research Centre
 PKU Corporate Finance & Law Research Centre
 PKU Centre for Resources, Energy and Environmental Law Studies
 PKU Soft Law Studies
 PKU Institute of Labor Law and Social Security Act
 PKU Joint Center for China-US Law and Policy Studies
 PKU Center for Human Rights and Humanitarian Law Studies
 PKU Research Center for Clear Society
 PKU Tax Law Research Centre
 PKU Center for Charity, Sports and Law
 PKU Research Center for NPO Law
 PKU-Yale Joint Centre for Law and Policy Reform Studies
 PKU Institute of International Economic Law
 PKU Research Centre for Competition Law
 PKU Maritime Law Research Centre
 PKU Corporation and Company Law Research Centre
 PKU Centre for People's Congress and Foreign Legislature Studies
 PKU Centre for International Intellectual Property Law
 PKU Centre for Constitution Administrative Law Studies
 China's Centre for Enterprise Legal Risk Management Studies
 PKU Institute of Positive Law
 PKU Research Centre for Education Law
 PKU Centre for WTO Law Study
 PKU Law & Development Academy

References

External links 
 

Law schools in China
Peking University